The Weslake V12 engine family is a series of four-stroke, 60-degree, naturally-aspirated, V-12 racing engine, designed, developed and produced by Weslake; between 1966 and 1992.

The engine started life Weslake 58, as a naturally aspirated 3-litre 12-cylinder engine developed at Weslake in 1966. The engine had a four-valve cylinder head and a high compression ratio of 12:1. This engine was the first true four-valve engine of the new 3-litre Formula 1 engine formula, in force from 1966. The high-revving racing engine had a high piston speed of 21.1 m/s. Due to the small cylinder spacing, the engine had a long stroke: With a bore of 72.8 mm and a stroke of 60.3 mm, the Weslake 58 was the racing engine with the smallest bore and the longest stroke of its time. In its original form, the engine produced 271 kW (364 hp), which could later be increased to up to 420 hp.

The engine was very light at 175 kg for a 12-cylinder and, at 67.4 cm long, was shorter than any other 1960s 12-cylinder racing engine. While the engine was 12.4 cm longer than the Cosworth V8 engine, it was 20 cm narrower.

3.0 L engine (Weslake 58/Weslake 3000) 
In 1966 Dan Gurney commissioned Weslake Engineering to build an Aubrey Woods designed 3.0-litre V12 Formula One engine for his Eagle Mk1.  Their efforts produced a V12 that was smooth and powerful. At Monza, an insight into the future of engine design was seen for the first time. The engine had four valves per cylinder at a narrow included angle (thirty degrees) that allowed a single cover to enclose both the close-spaced camshafts on each bank. The sixty-degree-vee layout had a larger bore than stroke (72.8 × 60 mm). Gurney won the 1967 Race of Champions at Brands Hatch, a non-championship event, and the 1967 Belgian Grand Prix with the Eagle-Weslake V12 engine.

At Monza in 1966,  was available. This increased to  during the winter. At the 1967 Brands Hatch Race of Champions, Dan Gurney's engine gave  and Richie Ginther's engine gave . On test, up to  had been achieved. At Monaco, Gurney had , Ginther . (These are figures from Motoring News.) The engines peaked at around 10,000 rpm. Harry Weslake had an eventual goal of  @ 12,000 rpm. Later Ford sponsored (75.0 × 56.25 mm) versions in 1972 were quoted at  @ 10,500 rpm.

3.5 L engine 
The 3.5 L engine was designed by Graham Dale-Jones and built by Terry Hoyle's JHS company using a block derived from the Weslake V12 Grand Prix unit; and was branded as a 'BRM'. The engine was designed and built to compete in the 1992 World Sportscar Championship season.

Applications
Eagle Mk1
BRM P351
Mirage M6

References

Group C
Engines by model
Gasoline engines by model
V12 engines
Formula One engines